Ghunda Raj (Punjabi:) is 1994 Pakistani action film. It was directed by Saeed Rana and produced by Syed Mehmood Shah.

Cast
 Sultan Rahi as Sher Ali
 Saima as love interest of Sher Ali
 Umer Shareef as Dewana
 Nargis as love interest of Dewana
 Jan Rambo as Mastana
 Khushboo as love interest of Mastana
 Naghma as Mother of Sher Ali 
 Adeeb as Police inspector
 Humayun Qureshi as Abeel
 Tariq Shah as Jabar Khan
 Shafqat Cheema as Son of Abeel
 Asim Bukhari as Police inspector
 Afshan Qureshi

Soundtrack

Track listing

References

1994 action films
Pakistani action films
1994 films
Punjabi-language Pakistani films
1990s Punjabi-language films